Phymatellidae is a family of sea sponges.

Genera 
Neoaulaxinia Pisera & Lévi, 2002 
Neosiphonia Sollas, 1888
Reidispongia Lévi & Lévi, 1988

References
 

Tetractinellida